Peter Roy Edmunds is a British actor, photographer and artist based in London. He is best known for playing the series regular character of Peter, the Deputy Manager, in the ITV television comedy series Hotel Getaway.  His voice acting work is used in video games, commercials, documentaries, toys, films, audio books and television. In February 2018 he received 8 nominations, including Male Voiceover Artist of the Year, for the One Voice Awards 2018. In March 2019 he was nominated for Best Male Performance - Television Documentary Voiceover, at the One Voice Awards 2019. In March 2020 he received 4 nominations, including Male Voiceover Artist of the Year, for the One Voice Awards 2020.

Early life 
Born in Runcorn, Cheshire to Anglo-Welsh parents, Edmunds was raised in nearby Frodsham and attended Helsby High School. He studied Engineering at De Montfort University, Leicester and worked in IT before training as an actor at Drama Studio London.

Voice acting career 
Drama Studio London voice coaches highlighted Edmunds' vocal physiology, describing it as “very unusual - a deep resonant chest-voice combined with a light resonant head-voice" - giving him a unique sound. Upon graduating he began working as a voice actor and voiceover artist alongside his acting career.

Selected voice acting work

Acting career 
Edmunds has worked in film, television, theatre, commercials and standup comedy - most notably in the main cast role of Peter, the hapless deputy manager, in the British comedy series Hotel Getaway (ITV). In Hotel Getaway, the actors' performances were completely improvised, whilst numerous hidden cameras captured the footage. On film he acted alongside Toyah Willcox and Shirley Anne Field in the feel-good comedy feature The Power of Three. Prior to that he worked on a number of short films – playing the Newscaster in Car Stories by Hungarian auteur Krisztina Goda, the lead role of Tony in Killing Time by BAFTA award-winning screenwriter Ed Whitmore and an emotionally charged performance as the co-lead, playing The Gardener in Lost Property by Isabelle Livingstone. On the London stage he has appeared in several productions, playing roles as diverse as a forensic psychologist in Doomsday and a barfly in Time Out Critics’ Choice, Blue Eyes Red. Edmunds also performed stand-up in London and has featured as an in-vision performer in TV commercials for brands such as Nissan, Specsavers, Disney, Amazon and MTV.

Filmography

Theatre

Photography and art 
Edmunds started out painting with watercolour and later studied technical drawing as part of his engineering qualifications. He states that "photography offered the perfect blend of art and science". He travelled with his engineering work and found urban artistic inspiration in New York, Paris, Tokyo and Toronto. His first photography exhibition, titled "Cross Section", took place at Putney Library, London from June 14 to July 4, 2015.  In July 2017, his photograph of a running group in Delamere Forest, Cheshire won third prize in the PEFC UK & Ireland competition and was then put forward for the PEFC International "2017 PEFC Photographer of the Year" award. His photographs are featured on the BBC News website and the Vogue (PhotoVogue) website, with his image Rethink I being selected by the PhotoVogue curators for the daily Best Of collection. Saatchi Art featured Edmunds' photographs in three curated collections during 2015; New Photography, Limited Edition Photographs and Inspired by Impressionism. His photographic artworks have been collected across four continents.

Awards and nominations

Voice acting / voiceover

References

External links 

Living people
English male television actors
English male voice actors
People from Runcorn
Year of birth missing (living people)